Astelia is a genus of flowering plants  in the recently named family Asteliaceae. They are rhizomatous tufted perennials native to various islands in the Pacific, Indian, and South Atlantic Oceans, as well as to Australia and to the southernmost tip of South America. A significant number of the known species are endemic to New Zealand.   The species generally grow in forests, swamps and amongst low alpine vegetation; occasionally they are epiphytic.

Species

The genus is divided into a number of subgenera and these are further divided into sections. These contain the following species:

 subgenus Astelia
 section Astelia
 Astelia alpina  R.Br. - Pineapple Grass, Silver Astelia, native to eastern Australia
 Astelia alpina var. alpina
 Astelia alpina var. novae-hollandiae Skottsb.
 Astelia papuana Skottsb.- native to New Guinea
 Astelia linearis Hook.f.- native to North and South Islands of New Zealand
 Astelia linearis var. linearis
 Astelia linearis var. novae-zelandiae Skottsb.
 Astelia subulata (Hook.f.) Cheesem. - native to South Island  + Antipodean Islands of New Zealand
 section Palaeastelia Skottsb.
 Astelia hemichrysa (Lam.) Kunth - native to Réunion + Mauritius
 subgenus Asteliopsis Skottsb.
 section Desmoneuron Skottsb.
 Astelia solandri A.Cunn. - native to North and South Islands of New Zealand
 Astelia trinervia Kirk - native to North Island  and north-west South Island of New Zealand
 Astelia nadeaudii Drake - native to Tahiti + Raiatea in French Polynesia
 Astelia raiateensis J.W.Moore - see Astelia nadeaudii
 section Isoneuron Skottsb.
 Astelia banksii A.Cunn. - Native to North Island of New Zealand
 Astelia neocaledonica Schltr. - endemic to New Caledonia.
 subgenus Collospermum Skottsb.
 Astelia hastata Colenso - New Zealand - formerly Collospermum hastatum (Colenso) Skottsb.
 Astelia microsperma Colenso - North Island of New Zealand - formerly Collospermum microspermum (Colenso) Skottsb.
 Astelia montana Seem. - Fiji and Vanuatu - formerly Collospermum montanum (Seem.) Skottsb.
 Astelia samoense (Skottsb.) Birch - Samoa - formerly Collospermum samoense Skottsb.
 Astelia spicata Colenso, formerly Collospermum spicatum (Colenso) Skottsb., would fall into this subgenus but was rejected by Birch as a species.
 subgenus Tricella Skottsb.
 section Tricella Skottsb.
 Astelia australiana (J.H.Willis) L.B.Moore - Tall Astelia, native to the State of Victoria in Australia
 Astelia chathamica (Skottsb.) L.B.Moore - Silver Spear, native to Chatham Islands of New Zealand
 Astelia fragrans Col. - Bush Flax, Bush Lily, Kakaha, native to North and South Islands of New Zealand
 Astelia graminea L.B.Moore- native to northern South Island of New Zealand
 Astelia grandis Hook.f. ex Kirk- native to North and South Islands of New Zealand
 Astelia nervosa Banks & Sol. ex Hook.f.- Mountain Astelia, native to North and South Islands of New Zealand
 Astelia nivicola Ckn. ex Cheesem. - native to South Island of New Zealand
 Astelia nivicola var. nivicola
 Astelia nivicola var. moriceae L.B.Moore
 Astelia petriei Ckn. - native to South Island of New Zealand
 Astelia psychrocharis F.Muell. - Kosciusko Pineapple Grass, native to Mt. Kosciusko in Australia
 Astelia skottsbergii L.B.Moore - native to north-west South Island of New Zealand
 section Periastelia Skottsb.
 Astelia argyrocoma A.Heller ex Skottsb. - native to Kauai Island in Hawaii
 Astelia menziesiana Sm. in A.Rees - native to Hawaii
 Astelia rapensis Skottsb. - native to Rapa-Iti Island in French Polynesia
 Astelia tovii F.Br. - Marquesas in French Polynesia
 Astelia waialealae Wawra - native to Kauai Island in Hawaii
 section Micrastelia Skottsb.
 Astelia pumila (J.R.Forst.) Gaudich. - native to western Patagonia, Tierra del Fuego and Falkland Islands

References

Asparagales genera
Asteliaceae
Taxa named by Robert Brown (botanist, born 1773)
Taxa named by Daniel Solander
Taxa named by Joseph Banks